The Derbyshire County Football Association, simply known as the Derbyshire FA, is the governing body of football in the county of Derbyshire, England. The Derbyshire FA runs a number of cups at different levels for teams all across Derbyshire.

Affiliated leagues

Men's Saturday
Midlands Regional Alliance (1911) 
Derby Church League
Hope Valley Amateur League (1907) 
Matlock and District League

Ladies and girls	
Derbyshire Girls & Ladies League (2003)

Men's Sunday
Alfreton and District Sunday League	
Chesterfield and District Sunday League (1966) 
Derby City League - Sunday Morning
Derby Taverners Sunday League (1963) 
Long Eaton Sunday League (1970)

Small sided 
Match Night - Chesterfield Mondays 
Power Leagues  
Soccer Sixes - Chesterfield

Youth 
Derby City League - Saturday Youth 
Derby City League - Sunday Morning Youth
Derby Mini-Soccer Lge (2005) 
Derwent Valley Junior League (1970) 
Rowsley and District Youth League

Other

Disbanded or amalgamated leagues

Leagues that were affiliated to the Derbyshire FA have disbanded or amalgamated with other leagues include:

Long Eaton and District Church League

Affiliated member clubs

Among the notable clubs that are affiliated to the Derbyshire FA are:

Alfreton Town
Belper Town
Belper United
Borrowash Victoria
Buxton
Chapel Town
Chesterfield
Derby County
Glapwell
Glossop North End
Graham Street Prims
Gresley Rovers
Heanor Town
Holbrook Sports
Ilkeston Town
Long Eaton United
Matlock Town
Mickleover
New Mills
Pinxton
Sheffield
Staveley Miners Welfare

County Cups

External links
 Derbyshire FA's official website

County football associations
Football in Derbyshire